Indrashil University is private university located in near the village Rajpur in Mahesana district, Gujarat, India. The university was established in 2017 through the Gujarat Private Universities (Amendment) Act, 2017, which also established P P Savani University, Karnavati University and Swarnim Startup & Innovation University.

References

External links

Universities in Gujarat
2017 establishments in Gujarat
Educational institutions established in 2017